The University of Piraeus (UniPi; , ΠαΠει) is a Greek public university located in Piraeus, Greece with a total of ten academic departments focused mainly on Business Management, Computer science, Economics, Finance and Maritime Studies.

The University of Piraeus has the second-oldest business school established in Greece, while the Department of Banking and Financial Management is the country's oldest academic department in the area of finance.

History 

The university was founded in 1938 by the Industrialists and Tradesmen Association under the name "School for Industrial Studies" and its original aim was the advanced training of managerial executives. In 1945, it was renamed to the "Higher School for Industrial Studies", while in 1958 it was renamed again as the "Graduate School for Industrial Studies" and its seat was established in Piraeus. Since then the university has evolved from its original sole focus on business management and added additional academic fields, such as economics, finance, maritime studies, informatics, and statistics. In 1966, it became a public university, and in 1989, it received its present name.

Academic structure 
Each of the following 9 departments offer undergraduate programmes with a corresponding four-year Bachelor of Science (B.Sc.) degree upon completion.

Postgraduate studies 

The university is one of the two public universities in Greece that offer an Executive M.B.A. programme. Additionally, there are numerous postgraduate programmes that offer an M.B.A. or a M.Sc. degree upon completion, such as in Actuarial Science and Risk Management, Accounting, Finance, Banking, Maritime Economics, Business Administration, Marketing, Applied Statistics, Economic and Business Strategy, ICT and so on.

Research 
The institution is home to the University of Piraeus Research Center (UPRC) which was founded in 1989.

In addition, many cooperation agreements under the Erasmus +, as well as other bilateral cooperation agreements and inter-university provided, exchange of students and staff, exchange of teaching and research material and conduct joint research projects and conferences. Moreover, the university is a member of international organizations such as European University Association, AACSB, International Association of Universities, etc.

Academic evaluation
In 2016 the external evaluation committee gave University of Piraeus a Positive evaluation.

An external evaluation of all academic departments in Greek universities was conducted by the  Hellenic Quality Assurance and Accreditation Agency (HQA) in 2008-2014.

Governance

The university is managed by the Rectorial Council and the Senate.

The Senate consists of the rector, the two vice-rectors, the departments' chairpersons, one representative from each department's student body, two representatives from the postgraduate students and special postgraduate scholars, one representative from the assistant tutors and scientific contributors, one representative from the special teaching staff, one representative from the administrative staff, and one representative from the special administrative technical staff. There are also representatives of the associate professors, the assistant professors and the lecturers.

Notable alumni
Nasser Al-Khelaifi, businessman, president of Paris Saint-Germain

See also
 List of universities in Greece
 List of research institutes in Greece
 European Higher Education Area
 Education in Greece
 Open access in Greece

Notes

External links

 University of Piraeus – Official website (old website)
 University of Piraeus Central Library 
 Hellenic Quality Assurance and Accreditation Agency (HQA) 
 "ATHENA" Plan for Higher Education 
 Hellenic Academic Libraries Link (HEAL-Link)) 
 Kallipos (e-books Greek academic publishing) 
 Greek Research and Technology Network (GRNET) 
 Kallipos (e-books Greek academic publishing) 
 Study in Greece – Official portal for studies in Greece 

 
Universities in Greece
Universities and colleges in Attica
Educational institutions established in 1938
1938 establishments in Greece